Todd David Cerney (August 8, 1953 – March 14, 2011) was an American songwriter and musician.

He composed "Good Morning Beautiful", a 2002 five-week country number one (Billboard) hit for Steve Holy (co-written with Zack Lyle); "The Blues Is My Business" (co-written with Kevin Bowe), part of Etta James' 2003 Grammy Award-winning album "Let's Roll"; and "I'll Still Be Loving You", a 1987 country number one (Billboard) hit for Restless Heart (co-written with Pam Rose, Mary Ann Kennedy, and Pat Bunch). He and his co-writers were nominated for a Grammy Award for "I'll Still Be Loving You". The song won the 1988 award for "ASCAP Country Song of the Year".

Cerney was born in Detroit, Michigan, and graduated from Zanesville High School in Zanesville, Ohio in 1971. He began his song-writing career after moving to Nashville, where he initially worked at Buzz Cason's Creative Workshop as an audio engineer. Some of the earliest artists to record his songs include Steve Carlisle ("I'll Fall in Love Again") and Levon Helm ("Blue House of Broken Hearts").

Music career
Cerney became known as the "Rock Doctor" after co-writing songs with members of various bands including Cheap Trick, Eddie Money, Loverboy and Bad English.  Popular artists to record his compositions include Aretha Franklin (with the Four Tops) "If Ever A Love There Was" (part of the soundtrack for the film "I'm Gonna Git You Sucka" – the song hit the top 40 in both the R&B and Adult Contemporary charts (Billboard)), John Anderson's "Till I Get Used to the Pain" and Ty Herndon's "No Mercy", which peaked at #26 on the Billboard Country Music charts.

In 1988 Cerney traveled to Russia as one of 28 songwriters who participated in the Music Speaks Louder Than Words project – a collaboration between American and Soviet songwriters which included Michael Bolton and Cyndi Lauper.  During his two weeks in Russia he cowrote the songs "Speak to My Heart" (performed by Phoebe Snow) and "Don't Stop Now" (performed by The Cover Girls, music by Viktor Reznikov).

In October 2009, Kenny Rogers and Dolly Parton reunited for the first time in 25 years to sing "Tell Me That You Love Me," a duet that Cerney co-wrote. The song was featured in Rogers' three-CD box set "Kenny Rogers: The First 50 Years" on Time-Life Records. In 2010, American Idol runner-up Bo Bice included a song he co-wrote with Cerney, "Keep on Rollin'," on his "3" album.

Cerney played guitar, mandolin, harmonica, keyboards and sang lead and backing vocals with various artists including backing vocals for Kenny Rogers and Levon Helm, mandolin for the Dixie Chicks and the Nashville Mandolin Ensemble and a full range of instruments for various songwriter groups including Thom Shepherd & the Nashville Songwriters Band. He also worked with three former members of the soft-rock band Bread – Jimmy Griffin, Robb Royer and Larry Knechtel – forming "Toast" (later renamed "Radio Dixie") during the mid-1990s, recording a number of songs for an album release that remained unfinished.

Death
Cerney died in Nashville, Tennessee on March 14, 2011, from melanoma, a disease with which he had first been diagnosed with in November 2010, following a brain seizure. He was 57 years old.

Chart Singles Written by Todd Cerney

The following is a list of Todd Cerney compositions that were chart hits.

Awards

References

1953 births
2011 deaths
Musicians from Detroit
People from Zanesville, Ohio
People from Nashville, Tennessee
Deaths from melanoma
Deaths from cancer in Tennessee
Songwriters from Michigan
Songwriters from Ohio
Songwriters from Tennessee